Thiruvanchoor Radhakrishnan (born 26 December 1949) is an Indian politician from the state of Kerala. From 13 April 2012 to 1 January 2014, he was the Home Minister in Oommen Chandy Ministry, Government of Kerala. He simultaneously held the Vigilance portfolio for the same time period and subsequently took over Forest, Transport, Sports, Cinema & Environment portfolios for the remaining duration of the ministry

Personal life
Thiruvanchoor Radhakrishnan was born to K. P. Parameswaran Pillai and M. G. Gourikutty on 26 December 1949 at Thiruvanchoor in the erstwhile  United State of Travancore and Cochin. He completed a Bachelor of Law (LL.B) degree from Government Law College, Thiruvananthapuram and worked as an advocate in Kottayam bar.

He married Lalithambika. They have two sons, Dr. Anupam Radhakrishnan and Arjun Radhakrishnan; and a daughter, Athira Radhakrishnan.

Political life
Thiruvanchoor entered public service as a student activist, through Balajanasakhyam, KSU and Youth Congress, rising to become the leader of various youth organizations. He held many important positions within KSU, Youth Congress and KPCC, including:
 
 President, All Kerala Balajanasakhyam (1965)
 Chairman, Baselias College Union and General Secretary (1967)
 KSU State General secretary (1967)
 KSU State President (1967)
 Youth Congress State President (1978)
 KPCC General Secretary (1984-2001)
 Opposition Chief Whip (12th Kerala Assembly)

He was elected to Kerala Legislative Assembly in 1991, 1996, 2001 and 2006 from Adoor and currently represents Kottayam constituency. He also served as the General Secretary of the Kerala Pradesh Congress Committee (I).

Administrative roles
UDF Government 2004–2006:

 Minister of Irrigation & Water Resources (2004–2006)
 Minister of Parliamentary Affairs (2004–2006)
 Minister of Forest (March 2005)
 Minister of Health (January 2006)

UDF Government 2011–2016:

 Minister of Revenue (May 2011 – April 2012)
 Home Minister (13 April 2012 – 31 December 2013)
 Minister for Forests, Sports, Cinema, Road Transport, Environment (1 January 2014 – 12 May 2016)

References

Living people
1949 births
Malayali politicians
Indian National Congress politicians from Kerala
Kerala MLAs 1991–1996
Kerala MLAs 1996–2001
Kerala MLAs 2006–2011
Kerala MLAs 2011–2016
Kerala MLAs 2016–2021
Government Law College, Thiruvananthapuram alumni